Lope de Vega, officially the Municipality of Lope de Vega, is a 4th class municipality in the province of Northern Samar, Philippines. According to the 2020 census, it has a population of 14,690 people.

It is bordered in the north by Catarman and Mondragon in the east and the province of Samar in the south.

Lope de Vega was created under Batas Pambansa Blg. 69 on May 1, 1980, separating 22 barangays from Catarman. It is named after the Baroque Spanish playwright and poet Lope de Vega.

Geography

Barangays
Lope De Vega is politically subdivided into 22 barangays.

Climate

Demographics

Economy

Transportation
Lope de Vega is served by buses, jeepneys, and van-for-hire with service to Catarman, Calbayog and to Tacloban City. There are ships also that travels from Calbayog to Cebu City. The town has no airport, but is accessible via nearby Catarman National Airport and Calbayog Airport.

References

External links
 [ Philippine Standard Geographic Code]
 Philippine Census Information
 Local Governance Performance Management System

Municipalities of Northern Samar